Lee Williamson (born August 10, 1968) is a former American football quarterback who played one season with the Anaheim Piranhas of the Arena Football League. He played college football at Presbyterian College. He was also a member of the Scottish Claymores and Houston Oilers.

References

External links
Just Sports Stats

Living people
1968 births
American football quarterbacks
Presbyterian Blue Hose football players
Scottish Claymores players
Anaheim Piranhas players